Syria (Hieroglyphic Luwian: 𔒂𔒠 Sura/i) or Sham is the name of a historical region located east of the Mediterranean Sea in Western Asia, broadly synonymous with the Levant. Other synonyms are Greater Syria or Syria-Palestine. The region boundaries have changed throughout history. In modern times, the term "Syria" alone is used to refer to the Syrian Arab Republic.

The term is originally derived from Assyria, an ancient civilization centered in northern Mesopotamia, modern-day Iraq. During the Hellenistic period, the term Syria was applied to the entire Levant as Coele-Syria. Under Roman rule, the term was used to refer to the province of Syria, later divided into Syria Phoenicia and Coele Syria, and to the province of Syria Palaestina. Under the Byzantines, the provinces of Syria Prima and Syria Secunda emerged out of Coele Syria. After the Muslim conquest of the Levant, the term was superseded by the Arabic equivalent Shām, and under the Rashidun, Umayyad, Abbasid, and Fatimid caliphates, Bilad al-Sham was the name of a metropolitan province encompassing most of the region. In the 19th century, the name Syria was revived in its modem Arabic form to denote the whole of Bilad al-Sham, either as Suriyah or the modern form Suriyya, which eventually replaced the Arabic name of Bilad al-Sham. 

After World War I, the boundaries of the region were last defined in modern times by the proclamation of and subsequent definition by French and British mandatory agreement. The area was passed to French and British Mandates following World War I and divided into Greater Lebanon, various states under Mandatory French rule, British-controlled Mandatory Palestine and the Emirate of Transjordan. The term Syria itself was applied to several mandate states under French rule and the contemporaneous but short-lived Arab Kingdom of Syria. The Syrian-mandate states were gradually unified as the State of Syria and finally became the independent Syria in 1946. Throughout this period, pan-Syrian nationalists advocated for the creation of a Greater Syria.

Etymology and evolution of the term 
For Pliny the Elder and Pomponius Mela, Syria covered the entire Fertile Crescent.

In Late Antiquity, "Syria" meant a region located to the East of the Mediterranean Sea, West of the Euphrates River, North of the Arabian Desert and South of the Taurus Mountains, thereby including modern Syria, Lebanon, Jordan, Israel, the Palestine, and parts of Southern Turkey, namely the Hatay Province and the western half of the Southeastern Anatolia Region. This late definition is equivalent to the region known in Classical Arabic by the name  (which means the north [country] (from the root   "left, north")). After the Islamic conquest of Byzantine Syria in the 7th century CE, the name Syria fell out of primary use in the region itself, being superseded by the Arabic equivalent Shām, but survived in its original sense in Byzantine and Western European usage, and in Syriac Christian literature. In the 19th century the name Syria was revived in its modem Arabic form to denote the whole of Bilad al-Sham, either as Suriyah or the modern form Suriyya, which eventually replaced the Arabic name of Bilad al-Sham. After World War I, the name Syria was applied to the French Mandate for Syria and the Lebanon and the contemporaneous but short-lived Arab Kingdom of Syria.

Geography

In the most common historical sense, 'Syria' refers to the entire northern Levant, including Alexandretta and the Ancient City of Antioch or in an extended sense the entire Levant as far south as Roman Egypt, but not including Mesopotamia. The area of "Greater Syria"; also called "Natural Syria" or "Northern Land", extends roughly over the Bilad al-Sham province of the medieval Arab caliphates, encompassing the Eastern Mediterranean (or Levant) and Western Mesopotamia. The Muslim conquest of the Levant in the seventh century gave rise to this province, which encompassed much of the region of Syria, and came to largely overlap with this concept. Other sources indicate that the term Greater Syria was coined during Ottoman rule, after 1516, to designate the approximate area included in present-day Palestine, Syria, Jordan, Lebanon, and Israel.

The uncertainty in the definition of the extent of "Syria" is aggravated by the etymological confusion of the similar-sounding names Syria and Assyria. The question of the ultimate etymological identity of the two names remains open today, but regardless of etymology, the two names have often been taken as exchangeable or synonymous from the time of Herodotus. However, by the time of the Roman Empire, 'Syria' and 'Assyria' began to refer to two separate entities, Roman Syria and Roman Assyria.

Killebrew and Steiner, treating the Levant as the Syrian region, gave the boundaries of the region as such: the Mediterranean Sea to the west, the Arabian Desert and Mesopotamia to the east, and the Taurus Mountains of Anatolia to the north. The Muslim geographer Muhammad al-Idrisi visited the region in 1150 and assigned the northern regions of Bilad al-Sham as the following:In the Levantine sea are two islands: Rhodes and Cyprus; and in Levantine lands: Antarsus, Laodice, Antioch, Mopsuhestia, Adana, Anazarbus, Tarsus, Kirkesia, Ḥamrtash, Antalya, al-Batira, al-Mira, Macri, Astroboli; and in the interior lands: Apamea, Salamiya, Qinnasrin, al-Castel, Aleppo, Resafa, Raqqa, Rafeqa, al-Jisr, Manbij, Mar'ash, Saruj, Ḥarran, Edessa, Al-Ḥadath, Samosata, Malatiya, Ḥusn Mansur, Zabatra, Jersoon, al-Leen, al-Bedandour, Cirra and Touleb.

For Pliny the Elder and Pomponius Mela, Syria covered the entire Fertile Crescent. In Late Antiquity, "Syria" meant a region located to the east of the Mediterranean Sea, west of the Euphrates River, north of the Arabian Desert, and south of the Taurus Mountains, thereby including modern Syria, Lebanon, Jordan, Israel, the State of Palestine, and the Hatay Province and the western half of the Southeastern Anatolia Region of southern Turkey. This late definition is equivalent to the region known in Classical Arabic by the name , which means the north [country] (from the root   "left, north"). After the Islamic conquest of Byzantine Syria in the seventh century, the name Syria fell out of primary use in the region itself, being superseded by the Arabic equivalent Bilād ash-Shām ("Northern Land'"), but survived in its original sense in Byzantine and Western European usage, and in Syriac Christian literature. In the 19th century, the name Syria was revived in its modern Arabic form to denote the whole of Bilad al-Sham, either as Suriyah or the modern form Suriyya, which eventually replaced the Arabic name of Bilad al-Sham. After World War I, the name 'Syria' was applied to the French Mandate for Syria and the Lebanon, and the contemporaneous but short-lived Arab Kingdom of Syria.

Today, the largest metropolitan areas in the region are Amman, Tel Aviv, Damascus, Beirut, Aleppo and Gaza City.

Etymology

Syria

The oldest attestation of the name 'Syria' is from the 8th century BC in a bilingual inscription in Hieroglyphic Luwian and Phoenician. In this inscription, the Luwian word Sura/i was translated to Phoenician ʔšr "Assyria." For Herodotus in the 5th century BC, Syria extended as far north as the Halys (the modern Kızılırmak River) and as far south as Arabia and Egypt.

The name 'Syria' derives from the ancient Greek name for Assyrians, which the Greeks applied without distinction to various Near Eastern peoples living under the rule of Assyria. Modern scholarship confirms the Greek word traces back to the cognate , .

That name was not widely used among Muslims before about 1870, but it had been used by Christians earlier. According to the Syriac Orthodox Church, "Syrian" meant "Christian" in early Christianity. In English, "Syrian" historically meant a Syrian Christian such as Ephrem the Syrian. Following the declaration of Syria in 1936, the term "Syrian" came to designate citizens of that state, regardless of ethnicity. The adjective "Syriac" has come into common use since as an ethnonym to avoid the ambiguity of "Syrian".

Currently, the Arabic term  usually refers to the modern state of Syria, as opposed to the historical region of Syria.

Shaam
Greater Syria has been widely known as Ash-Shām. The term etymologically in Arabic means "the left-hand side" or "the north", as someone in the Hejaz facing east, oriented to the sunrise, will find the north to the left. This is contrasted with the name of Yemen, correspondingly meaning "the right-hand side" or "the south".

The root of Shaam,  also has connotations of unluckiness, which is traditionally associated with the left-hand and with the colder north-winds. Again this is in contrast with Yemen, with felicity and success, and the positively-viewed warm-moist southerly wind; a theory for the etymology of Arabia Felix denoting Yemen, by translation of that sense.

The Shaam region is sometimes defined as the area that was dominated by Damascus, long an important regional center. In fact, the word Ash-Sām, on its own, can refer to the city of Damascus. Continuing with the similar contrasting theme, Damascus was the commercial destination and representative of the region in the same way Sanaa held for the south.

Quran 106:2 alludes to this practice of caravans traveling to Syria in the summer, to avoid the colder weather, and to likewise sell commodities in Yemen in the winter.

Despite this, there has been a long-standing folk association between the two names and even the region, as most of the claimed Biblical descendants of Shem have been historically placed in the vicinity.

Historically, Baalshamin, was a Semitic sky god in Canaan/Phoenicia and ancient Palmyra. Hence, Sham refers to (heaven or sky). Moreover; in the Hebrew language, sham (שָׁמַ) is derived from Akkadian šamû meaning "sky". For instance, the Hebrew word for the Sun is shemesh, where "shem/sham" from shamayim  (Akkadian: šamû) means "sky" and esh (Akkadian: išātu) means "fire", i.e. "sky-fire".

History

Ancient Syria
Herodotus uses  to refer to the stretch of land from the Halys river, including Cappadocia (The Histories, I.6) in today's Turkey to the Mount Casius (The Histories II.158), which Herodotus says is located just south of Lake Serbonis (The Histories III.5). According to Herodotus various remarks in different locations, he describes Syria to include the entire stretch of Phoenician coastal line as well as cities such Cadytis (Jerusalem) (The Histories III.159).

Hellenistic Syria
In Greek usage, Syria and Assyria were used almost interchangeably, but in the Roman Empire, Syria and Assyria came to be used as distinct geographical terms. "Syria" in the Roman Empire period referred to "those parts of the Empire situated between Asia Minor and Egypt", i.e. the western Levant, while "Assyria" was part of the Persian Empire, and only very briefly came under Roman control (116–118 AD, marking the historical peak of Roman expansion).

Roman Syria

In the Roman era, the term Syria is used to comprise the entire northern Levant and has an uncertain border to the northeast that Pliny the Elder describes as including, from west to east, the Kingdom of Commagene, Sophene, and Adiabene, "formerly known as Assyria".

Various writers used the term to describe the entire Levant region during this period; the New Testament used the name in this sense on numerous occasions.

In 64 BC, Syria became a province of the Roman Empire, following the conquest by Pompey. Roman Syria bordered Judea to the south, Anatolian Greek domains to the north, Phoenicia to the West, and was in constant struggle with Parthians to the East. In 135 AD, Syria-Palaestina became to incorporate the entire Levant and Western Mesopotamia. In 193, the province was divided into Syria proper (Coele-Syria) and Phoenice. Sometime between 330 and 350 (likely c. 341), the province of Euphratensis was created out of the territory of Syria Coele and the former realm of Commagene, with Hierapolis as its capital.

After c. 415 Syria Coele was further subdivided into Syria I, with the capital remaining at Antioch, and Syria II or Salutaris, with capital at Apamea on the Orontes River. In 528, Justinian I carved out the small coastal province Theodorias out of territory from both provinces.

Bilad al-Sham

The region was annexed to the Rashidun Caliphate after the Muslim victory over the Byzantine Empire at the Battle of Yarmouk, and became known as the province of Bilad al-Sham. During the Umayyad Caliphate, the Shām was divided into five junds or military districts. They were Jund Dimashq (for the area of Damascus), Jund Ḥimṣ (for the area of Homs), Jund Filasṭīn (for the area of Palestine) and Jund al-Urdunn (for the area of Jordan). Later Jund Qinnasrîn'' was created out of part of Jund Hims. The city of Damascus was the capital of the Islamic Caliphate, until the rise of the Abbasid Caliphate.

Ottoman Syria

In the later ages of the Ottoman times, it was divided into wilayahs or sub-provinces the borders of which and the choice of cities as seats of government within them varied over time. The vilayets or sub-provinces of Aleppo, Damascus, and Beirut, in addition to the two special districts of Mount Lebanon and Jerusalem. Aleppo consisted of northern modern-day Syria plus parts of southern Turkey, Damascus covered southern Syria and modern-day Jordan, Beirut covered Lebanon and the Syrian coast from the port-city of Latakia southward to the Galilee, while Jerusalem consisted of the land south of the Galilee and west of the Jordan River and the Wadi Arabah.

Although the region's population was dominated by Sunni Muslims, it also contained sizable populations of Shi'ite, Alawite and Ismaili Muslims, Syriac Orthodox, Maronite, Greek Orthodox, Roman Catholics and Melkite Christians, Jews and Druze.

Arab Kingdom and French occupation

The Occupied Enemy Territory Administration (OETA) was a British, French and Arab military administration over areas of the former Ottoman Empire between 1917 and 1920, during and following World War I. The wave of Arab nationalism evolved towards the creation of the first modern Arab state to come into existence, the Hashemite Arab Kingdom of Syria on 8 March 1920. The kingdom claimed the entire region of Syria whilst exercising control over only the inland region known as OETA East. This led to the acceleration of the declaration of the French Mandate for Syria and the Lebanon and British Mandate for Palestine at the 19–26 April 1920 San Remo conference, and subsequently the Franco-Syrian War, in July 1920, in which French armies defeated the newly proclaimed kingdom and captured Damascus, aborting the Arab state.

Thereafter, the French general Henri Gouraud, in breach of the conditions of the mandate, subdivided the French Mandate of Syria into six states. They were the states of Damascus (1920), Aleppo (1920), Alawite State (1920), Jabal Druze (1921), the autonomous Sanjak of Alexandretta (1921) (modern-day Hatay in Turkey), and Greater Lebanon (1920) which later became the modern country of Lebanon.

In pan-Syrian nationalism

The boundaries of the region have changed throughout history, and were last defined in modern times by the proclamation of the short-lived Arab Kingdom of Syria and subsequent definition by French and British mandatory agreement. The area was passed to French and British Mandates following World War I and divided into Greater Lebanon, various Syrian-mandate states, Mandatory Palestine and the Emirate of Transjordan. The Syrian-mandate states were gradually unified as the State of Syria and finally became the independent Syria in 1946. Throughout this period, Antoun Saadeh and his party, the Syrian Social Nationalist Party, envisioned "Greater Syria" or "Natural Syria", based on the etymological connection between the name "Syria" and "Assyria", as encompassing the Sinai Peninsula, Cyprus, modern Syria, Lebanon, Palestine, Jordan, Iraq, Kuwait, the Ahvaz region of Iran, and the Kilikian region of Turkey.

Religious significance

The region has sites that are significant to Abrahamic religions:

See also
 
 Cradle of civilization
 Crusader states
 Mashriq
 Middle East
 Names of the Levant
 Southern Levant

Notes

References

Citations
 Dictionary of Modern Written Arabic by Hans Wehr (4th edition, 1994).
 Michael Provence, "The Great Syrian Revolt and the Rise of Arab Nationalism", University of Texas Press, 2005.

Further reading
  pbk.; illustrated with b&w photos and maps; alternative ISBN on back cover: 0-19-506002-4

 
Levant
Near East
Ancient Near East
Geography of Syria
Geography of Jordan
Geography of the Middle East
Geography of Western Asia
Geographic history of Syria
History of Cyprus
History of Israel
History of Palestine (region)
History of Lebanon
History of Jordan
History of Turkey
History of Adana Province
History of Kahramanmaraş Province
History of Gaziantep Province
History of Mersin Province
History of Hatay Province
History of the Levant
Historical regions
Syria
Syria
Politics of Syria
Political movements
Regions of Eurasia
Regions of Asia
Syrian nationalism
 Consequences
1910s in Mandatory Syria
1920s in Mandatory Syria